Jhon Antonio Novoa Pino (born 27 December 1987), frequently referred as John Novoa, is a Chilean former footballer who played as a midfielder.

Career
A playmaker from the Cobreloa youth system, in August 2006 he moved abroad and joined Salvadoran club Alianza for the Apertura 2006. The next year, he returned to Cobreloa.

In 2009, he took part of the Unión Temuco squad what won the league title of the Tercera A and got promotion to the Primera B.

After a stint as a free agent, he played for Fernández Vial in the Segunda División Profesional.

Personal life
Following his retirement, he attended the Gabriela Mistral University and got a degree in business administration.

Honours
Unión Temuco
 Tercera A:

References

External links
 
 Jhon Novoa at PlaymakerStats.com

1987 births
Living people
People from El Loa Province
Chilean footballers
Chilean expatriate footballers
Cobreloa footballers
Alianza F.C. footballers
Unión Temuco footballers
C.D. Arturo Fernández Vial footballers
Chilean Primera División players
Salvadoran Primera División players
Tercera División de Chile players
Primera B de Chile players
Segunda División Profesional de Chile players
Chilean expatriate sportspeople in El Salvador
Expatriate footballers in El Salvador
Association football midfielders
Gabriela Mistral University alumni